Thelma is 2011 Filipino inspirational family-drama film, released by Star Cinema with Maja Salvador portraying the title-role. The film is directed by Paul Soriano and is inspired by true stories. The film premiered on September 7, 2011 and received an "A" rating from the Cinema Evaluation Board.

Production
Maja Salvador underwent training by a national track star and Survivor Philippines castaway Elma Muros and her husband Jojo Posadas for her role as a runner in the independent film. Paul Soriano was chosen to direct the film. Filming began whilst simultaneously taping for Salvador's show Minsan Lang Kita Iibigin.

Synopsis
Tomboyish Ilocano girl Thelma (Maja Salvador) discovers she has got a gift for speed. But while her talent creates new opportunities, it also presents new challenges for her and her family.

Cast
 Maja Salvador as Thelma
 John Arcilla as Aldo
 Tetchie Agbayani as Floring
 Perry Escaño as Carding
 Eliza Pineda as Hannah
 Sue Prado as Marie
 Jason Abalos as Sammy
 Elma Muros as Coach Rose

References

External links 

Star Cinema films
2010s sports drama films
Philippine sports drama films
Running films
Films directed by Paul Soriano